Boncho Novakov (born 7 May 1935) is a former Bulgarian cyclist. He competed in the 1000m time trial at the 1960 Summer Olympics.

References

External links
 

1935 births
Living people
Bulgarian male cyclists
Olympic cyclists of Bulgaria
Cyclists at the 1960 Summer Olympics
People from Razgrad